The 1982 UCI Road World Championships took place between 4-5 September 1982 in Goodwood, Great Britain.

Results

Medal table

External links 
 Men's results
 Women's results
  Results at sportpro.it

 
UCI Road World Championships by year
UCI Road World Championships 1982
1982 in road cycling
Uci Road World Championships, 1982